The 1991 Vanderbilt Commodores football team represented Vanderbilt University in the 1991 NCAA Division I-A football season as a member of the Southeastern Conference (SEC). The Commodores were led by head coach Gerry DiNardo in his first season and finished with a record of five wins and six losses (5–6 overall, 3–4 in the SEC).

Schedule

References

Vanderbilt
Vanderbilt Commodores football seasons
Vanderbilt Commodores football